Prisoner of the Night is an album by Dutch hard rock band Golden Earring, released in 1980. In the US, the album was titled Long Blond Animal.

Track listing
All songs written by Hay and Kooymans.

"Long Blond Animal" - 3:36
"No for an Answer" - 4:13
"My Town" - 3:06
"Prisoner of the Night" - 4:50
"I Don't Wanna Be Nobody Else" - 4:41
"Cut 'Em Down to Size" (Gerritsen, Hay, Kooymans, Zuiderwijk) - 3:23
"Will and Mercy" - 3:36
"Come in Outerspace" - 4:24
"Going Crazy Again" - 4:59

Personnel
George Kooymans - guitar, vocals
Rinus Gerritsen - bass guitar, keyboards
Barry Hay - flute, vocals , guitar
Cesar Zuiderwijk - drums

Additional personnel
Tony Britnel - saxophone, tenor saxophone
Robert Jan Stips - synthesiser, keyboards

Production
Producer: George Kooymans
Engineer: John Kriek
Mixing: George Kooymans, John Kriek
Photography: Kees Tabak

Charts

References

Golden Earring albums
1980 albums
Polydor Records albums